New Prospect Elementary School may refer to:
New Prospect Elementary School, Alpharetta, Georgia - Fulton County School System
New Prospect Elementary School, Anderson, South Carolina - Anderson School District Five
New Prospect Elementary School, Inman, South Carolina - Spartanburg County School District 1